Norovyn Altankhuyag (born 20 January 1958) is a Mongolian politician who was the Prime Minister of Mongolia from 2012 to 2014 and a Member of Parliament. Democratic Party's National Consultative Committee (NCC) elected him as the Leader of Democratic Party of Mongolia in 2008. He was First Deputy Prime Minister of Mongolia in the coalition government of the Mongolian People's Party and Democratic Party from 2008 to 2012.

Previously, he served as the Minister of Agriculture and Industry between 1996 and 2000 and the Minister of Finance from 2004 to 2006. He served as senior advisor to the President of Mongolia, Khaltmaagiin Battulga, from 2017 until his resignation in early 2019.

Early life
Altankhuyag was born in Uvs Province in Mongolia and attended Ulaangom's 1st secondary school from 1966 to 1976. Then he graduated the Faculty of Physics and Mathematics of National University of Mongolia. After the graduation, he was honored to stay as a professor at the university.

Political career
During the 1990 Democratic Revolution in Mongolia, he was one of pioneers in the youth movement. With his colleagues, he initiated the Democratic Socialist Movement. On 21 February 1990, the first meeting to establish the Mongolian Social Democratic Party was held, and he was elected as a member of the party establishing commission.

Between 1990 and 2006, he served as a General Secretary of different political parties four times. He was elected as the Member of Parliament twice.

Following the 2008 Mongolian parliamentary election, Democratic Party leader Tsakhiagiin Elbegdorj resigned as a result of the party's controversial defeat and Altankhuyag was elected as the Democratic Party's new leader. During his leadership, Democratic Party of Mongolia launched "Mongolian People—2020" action plan to strengthen the values of democracy and civil society.

Prime Minister of Mongolia (2012–2014) 
Following the 2012 Mongolian legislative election, Norovyn Altankhuyag was elected as the Prime Minister of Mongolia. During his tenure economic growth was 13.7% thanks largely to Oyu Tolgoi deposit. As a result of no confidence vote at the Parliament of Mongolia, Altankhuyag's Government was resigned on 5 November 2014.

References

External links
 Altankhuyag Norov's official website
Norov Altankhuyag appointed as 27th Premier – 10 August 2012 – news.mn

|-

1958 births
Democratic Party (Mongolia) politicians
Agriculture ministers of Mongolia
Finance ministers of Mongolia
Industry ministers of Mongolia
Living people
People from Uvs Province
Prime Ministers of Mongolia
National University of Mongolia alumni